Antha Sila Naatkal is a 1983 Indian Tamil-language film produced by Meenakshi Finance. It stars Mohan and Poornima .

Cast 

Mohan
Poornima
Nithya Ravindran
Manorama
Vennira Aadai Moorthy
T. V. Varadarajan

Soundtrack
Soundtrack was composed by Ilaiyaraaja.

References

1983 films
Films scored by Ilaiyaraaja
1980s Tamil-language films